Paulo Renato Centeno Holvorcem (born 10 July 1967) is a Brazilian amateur astronomer and mathematician who lives in Brasilia, Brazil.

He is a prolific discoverer of asteroids. He is credited by the Minor Planet Center with the discovery or co-discovery (with Charles W. Juels) of about 197 minor planets between 1998 and 2010.

Holvorcem with Juels also discovered two comets: C/2002 Y1 (Juels-Holvorcem) and C/2005 N1 (Juels-Holvorcem). Holvorcem was also involved in the discovery of C/2011 K1 (Schwartz-Holvorcem).

The main-belt asteroid 13421 Holvorcem was named after him on 9 January 2001.

Paulo's SkySift pipeline software is used by many observatories across the world for the detection of minor planets and transients.

List of discovered minor planets

See also

References

External links 
 Paulo Holvorcem's website
 CV of Paulo Holvorcem
 Minor Planet Center: Minor Planet Discoverers
 Harvard-Smithsonian Center for Astrophysics: 2003 Comet Awards Announced

Amateur astronomers
Brazilian astronomers
Discoverers of asteroids

Living people
People from Campinas
1967 births